The Seattle Steelheads were a Negro league baseball team from Seattle, Washington. Owned by Abe Saperstein, they were also known as the Harlem Globetrotters and Cincinnati Crescents, though occasionally the teams split and played each other.

Founding 
Abe Saperstein founded the Harlem Globetrotters baseball team in 1944 to complement his world-famous basketball team of the same name.

Also owned by Saperstein, the Cincinnati Crescents were an All-Star barnstorming baseball team that played in the mid-1940s.  The team was managed by Winfield Welch, and featured players such as Bill Blair, Sherwood Brewer, Luke Easter, Alvin Gipson, Bill Jefferson, Leaman Johnson, and Johnny Markham. The Globetrotters and Crescents combined operations and were charter members of the West Coast Negro Baseball League, changing their name to the Seattle Steelheads.

The Steelheads played in the West Coast Negro Baseball League and played their first game on June 1, 1946, against the San Diego Tigers, in front of 2,500 fans at Sick's Stadium. Its players included Cannonball Berry, Nap Gulley, Zell Miles, Rogers Pierre, Herb Simpson, and Fay Washington. The league folded after a month of play.

Controversy 
Catcher and manager Paul Hardy joined the Steelheads while still under contract with the Chicago American Giants, causing the Negro American League to ban its teams from playing games in Seattle.

Home fields 

Their primary home ballpark was Sick's Stadium. They also planned home games in Tacoma, Bremerton, Spokane, and Bellingham.

MLB throwback jerseys 

The Seattle Mariners honored the Steelheads when they wore 1946 Steelheads uniforms on September 9, 1995, at home against the Kansas City Royals. The Royals wore Kansas City Monarchs uniforms. The Mariners beat the Royals 6–4 in front of 39,157 fans at the Kingdome. The game was attended by former Steelhead player Sherwood Brewer. The Mariners wore a different variety of the Steelheads uniform on May 16, 2015 on "Turn Back the Clock Night" against the Boston Red Sox at Safeco Field, and lost to the Red Sox 4–2. On June 19th, 2021, the Mariners again wore the 1946 uniforms as part of Juneteenth.

References

External links
 Negro League Baseball Players Association: Seattle Steelheads

Further reading

Negro league baseball teams
Professional baseball teams in Washington (state)
African-American history in Seattle
Baseball in Cincinnati
Baseball in Seattle
Defunct baseball teams in Ohio
Defunct baseball teams in Washington (state)
Baseball teams disestablished in 1946
Baseball teams established in 1946